Lørenfallet is a village in Lillestrøm municipality, Norway. Its population is 1,021.

References

Villages in Akershus